Daham Sevane Singiththo (also known as the Children’s Development Foundation) is the largest early childhood education and after-school services provider in the county of Bodirajaramaya, Sri Lanka. Its focus is on the children of soldiers stationed at the Panagoda camp.

References

External links

 Online Children Learning Center

Educational organisations based in Sri Lanka